Dyesebel is a 1990 Filipino romantic fantasy film based on the Pilipino Komiks character of the same name. Directed by Mel Chionglo from a screenplay by Ricardo Lee, it stars Alice Dixson as the titular character and Richard Gomez, alongside Nadia Montenegro, Dennis Roldan, Chat Silayan, Perla Bautista, Lawrence Pineda and Mario Escudero. Produced by Regal Films, the film was released on January 18, 1990.

Cast

Richard Gomez as Edward
Robert Ortega as young Edward
Alice Dixson as Dyesebel / Sabel
Carmina Villaroel as young Dyesebel
Nadia Montenegro as Malou
Arlene Ragasa as young Malou
Dennis Roldan as Dennis
Chat Silayan as Banang
Perla Bautista as Dyesebel's mother 
Lawrence Pineda as Dodo
Mario Escudero as Dyesebel's father
Malu de Guzman as Marina
Vangie Labalan as Toyang
Flora Gasser as maid
Judy Ann Santos as Iday
Harvey Viscarra as Bokbok

Production
The production of Dyesebel lasted two years. It is the first film adaptation of Dyesebel to feature scenes that were shot underwater, as well as the first Dyesebel film where the titular character has an orange tailfin.

Release
Dyesebel was released on January 18, 1990. Since its release, the film is cited to have made actress Alice Dixson a mainstream celebrity in Philippine show business.

Home media
The entire film was made available on YouTube for streaming without charge by Regal Entertainment on September 9, 2020.

References

External links

1990 films
1990 romance films
1990s fantasy films
1990s romantic fantasy films
Filipino-language films
Films about mermaids
Films based on Philippine comics
Philippine fantasy films
Philippine films based on comics
Philippine romance films
Regal Entertainment films